Aldo Nicoli (born November 24, 1953) is an Italian professional football coach and a former player.

Career
Born in Bologna, Nicoli began playing football with Internazionale. He made his Serie A debut against Sampdoria on 5 May 1974.

Honours
 Serie A (women's football) champion as the manager of ACF Milan: 1992.

References

1953 births
Living people
Italian footballers
Serie A players
Inter Milan players
Calcio Foggia 1920 players
S.S. Lazio players
Delfino Pescara 1936 players
Italian football managers
Association football midfielders